
Gmina Borzytuchom is a rural gmina (administrative district) in Bytów County, Pomeranian Voivodeship, in northern Poland.

The gmina contains part of the protected area called Słupia Valley Landscape Park.

Villages
Gmina Borzytuchom contains the villages and settlements of Borzytuchom, Chotkowo, Dąbrówka, Jutrzenka, Kamieńc, Kamienica, Krosnowo, Niedarzyno, Osieki, Ryczyn and Struszewo.

Neighbouring gminas
Gmina Borzytuchom is bordered by the gminas of Bytów, Czarna Dąbrówka, Dębnica Kaszubska, Kołczygłowy and Tuchomie.

References
Polish official population figures 2006

Borzytuchom
Bytów County